David Woodward may refer to:

David Woodward (cartographer) (1942–2004), English-American cartographer
David Woodward (economist) (born 1959), British economist
David Woodard (born 1964), American conductor and writer